A Day in Hollywood / A Night in the Ukraine is a musical comedy consisting of two essentially independent one-act plays, with a book and lyrics by Dick Vosburgh and music by Frank Lazarus.  Additionally, songs by other composers are incorporated into the score. The musical premiered in the West End and then ran on Broadway.

Plot overview
The first act, A Day in Hollywood, is a revue of classic Hollywood songs of the 1930s performed by singers and dancers representing ushers from Grauman's Chinese Theatre. The second, A Night in the Ukraine, is loosely based on Anton Chekhov's one-act play The Bear, and is presented in the style of a Marx Brothers movie.  We follow Serge B. Samovar, a lawyer based on Groucho Marx, as he attempts to collect a 1,800 ruble fee from Mrs. Pavlenko - a wealthy widow. Other characters in this act include Gino (a Harpo Marx-inspired character), Carlo (a Chico Marx-inspired character), Nina, and Constantine (arguably a character inspired by Zeppo Marx).

In a review of a regional production the reviewer from The New York Times commented that the musical "...has a hybrid score that lists music by Frank Lazarus, with book and lyrics by Dick Vosburgh, additional songs composed by Jerry Herman and a solid midsection medley devoted to the prolific composer of popular movie music, Richard A. Whiting. We are treated to a pleasant musical grab bag..."

Productions
The musical premiered in the West End at the Mayfair Theatre on 28 March 1979, where it ran for 168 performances.

The musical opened on Broadway at the John Golden Theatre on May 1, 1980, transferred to the Royale Theatre on June 17, 1980, and closed on September 27, 1981, after 588 performances and nine previews. The musical was directed and co-choreographed by Tommy Tune, with Thommie Walsh as co-choreographer, with scenic design by Tony Walton, costume design by Michel Stuart and lighting design by Beverly Emmons.  The cast included David Garrison, Priscilla Lopez, Frank Lazarus, Peggy Hewett, Kate Draper, Albert Stephenson, and Stephen James.

Songs
(Songs are by Vosburgh and Lazarus unless otherwise noted)

Act 1
Just Go to the Movies (Music and lyrics by Jerry Herman)
Famous Feet
I Love a Film Cliché (Music by Trevor Lyttleton MBE)
Nelson (Music and lyrics by Herman)
The Best in the World (Music and lyrics by Herman)
Richard Whiting Medley:
It All Comes Out of the Piano
Ain't We Got Fun (Music by Richard A. Whiting, lyrics By Gus Kahn and Raymond B. Egan)
Too Marvelous for Words (Music by Whiting, lyrics by Johnny Mercer)
The Japanese Sandman (Music by Whiting, lyrics by Egan)
On the Good Ship Lollipop (Music by Whiting, lyrics by Sidney Clare)
Double Trouble (Music by Whiting and Ralph Rainger, lyrics by Leo Robin)
Louise (Music by Whiting, lyrics by Robin)
Sleepy Time Gal (Music by Whiting and Ange Lorenzo, lyrics by Egan and Joseph R. Alden)
It All Comes Out of the Piano
Beyond the Blue Horizon (Music by Whiting and W. Franke Harling, lyrics by Robin)
Thanks for the Memory (Music by Rainger, lyrics by Robin)
Another Memory
Doin' the Production Code
A Night in the Ukraine

Act 2
Hooray for Hollywood (Music by Whiting, lyrics by Mercer) (Added for the 2016 revival)
Samovar the Lawyer
Just Like That
Again 
A Duel! A Duel!
Natasha
A Night in the Ukraine (Reprise)

Awards and nominations

Original Broadway production

Lawsuit
Representatives of the Marx Brothers' interests (Groucho Marx Productions, on behalf of Groucho and Chico, and Harpo's widow Susan Marx) sued the musical's producers for violating the Marx Brothers' right of publicity. A lawyer for the plaintiffs said that they were not seeking to shut down the production, but only to demand a license fee for the use of the Marx Brothers characters. The District Court found in favor of the Marx heirs, applying New York law. However, on appeal, the decision was reversed, on the grounds that the Marx Brothers had been residents of California, and, at the time of the lawsuit, California law provided that a person's right of publicity either expired upon the person's death, or possibly, could pass to the person's heirs only under limited circumstances which could not restrict production of this musical. The lawsuit ultimately resulted in favor of the musical's producers.

References

External links
Internet Broadway Database listing
A Day in Hollywood / A Night in the Ukraine - Plot summary and character descriptions from StageAgent.com
A Day In Hollywood/A Night In The Ukraine Plot and Musical Numbers at guidetomusicaltheatre.com

1979 musicals
West End musicals
Broadway musicals
Musicals based on plays
Cultural depictions of the Marx Brothers
Tony Award-winning musicals